Leitra is a Danish company and also the name of the velomobile it produces.

In Sweden designs for a two-person, four-wheeled velomobile called the Fantom were sold as blueprints in the 1930s and 40s. Many thousands of sets of DIY instructions were sold, but very few vehicles were actually built. The body was made of plywood.

The oil shock of 1978-9 inspired Carl Georg Rasmussen, a Danish engineer and pilot, to design and build the first practical velomobile. A tadpole recumbent tricycle with full glass-fiber fairing, it was dubbed the Leitra (Danish: Let individuel transport, meaning "light individual transport").

About the company
Carl Georg Rasmussen initially formed the company as a limited partnership with ten investors – mostly friends and intending customers. He also received some of his early funding from other customers who, while not wishing to risk a direct investment in the company, were nevertheless prepared to make an advance purchase. This enabled Rasmussen to start work on an initial run of twelve Leitras in 1983.

About the Leitra velomobile
The Leitra is a three-wheeled, non-motorized vehicle designed for commuting, shopping, distribution of light goods, recreation, and touring. The international term for this type of vehicle is a velomobile. It is fast, but not designed specifically for racing.

The primary considerations for the design of such a tricycle with full fairing were:

 Safety in normal traffic,
 Cycling comfort in cold, windy, and wet weather,
 Sufficient payload for touring and shopping,
 Reliability in daily operation – including in wintertime.

For fair weather use the fairing can be removed in moments by means of a toe-activated snap coupling. The two luggage compartments can also be removed quickly without tools. 

The Leitra was approved by the Danish authorities for general use after systematic tests in 1982. Approval was given on the condition that the cyclist must be able to give unhindered arm signals for turning and stopping. This explains the characteristic open design of the fairing with soft fabric on both sides. The design of the built-in rearview mirror on top of the fairing was also approved by the Danish authorities.

The first Leitra was built in 1980. Since 1982 it has successfully participated in many tough rallies in Europe, such as Trondheim - Oslo (1983) and Paris-Brest-Paris (1987). It has proven to be a real practical vehicle for long-distance touring. Several million kilometers have been covered without personal injuries.

As of 2015, approximately 260 Leitras have been produced. Production is on an order-by-order basis, as each Leitra is built for a specific customer, and has currently slowed to about one Leitra per year, but renovation and repairs continue on velomobiles that make their way back to the company's workshop in Herlev – a suburb of Copenhagen.

In 2013 development began of the Leitra Wildcat – a detachable fairing designed to fit most any kind of recumbent trike.  Currently the Steintrike Nomad, Terratrike, TW Bent, and Leitra Sport have all been adapted to use the Wildcat fairing.

References

External links
 Leitra official page Or if it should become unavailable the web.archive.org copies.
 Official FaceBook page.

Cycle manufacturers of Denmark
Danish brands
Velomobiles